Shawn Sawyers (born 19 September 1976, in Jamaica) is a Jamaican professional football player who plays as a goalkeeper, in 2010 he transferred from Portmore United to Humble Lions F.C. in the Jamaica National Premier League.

International career
Sawyers made his debut for Jamaica in a May 2002 friendly match against Nigeria, coming on as a substitute for Aaron Lawrence. He has served as the long-time number two keeper for Jamaica. He has collected 29 caps since, his last international match being the February 2009 in a friendly match in London versus Nigeria.

Honors

Portmore United
CFU Club Championship: 1
 2005
Jamaica National Premier League: 3
 2003, 2005, 2008
JFF Champions Cup: 4
 2000, 2003, 2005, 2007

Jamaica
Caribbean Cup: 1
 2005

External links
 
 

1976 births
Living people
Jamaican footballers
Jamaica international footballers
Portmore United F.C. players
2005 CONCACAF Gold Cup players
Association football goalkeepers
National Premier League players